Rutger–Steuben Park Historic District is a  historic district in the city of Utica in Oneida County, New York. The district includes 63 contributing buildings and contains numerous examples of late nineteenth century Italian Villa style residences. A group of five exceptional dwellings are grouped together in a private park, known as Rutger Park, at the center of the district. One of the dwellings on Rutger Park was designed by architect Alexander Jackson Davis.   The Roscoe Conkling House is located at 3 Rutger Park and it was declared a National Historic Landmark in 1975.

It was listed on the National Register of Historic Places in 1973.

See also
List of Registered Historic Places in Oneida County, New York

References

Historic districts on the National Register of Historic Places in New York (state)
Houses on the National Register of Historic Places in New York (state)
Historic districts in Oneida County, New York
Italianate architecture in New York (state)
Houses in Oneida County, New York
National Register of Historic Places in Oneida County, New York